A trioxide is a compound with three oxygen atoms.  For metals with the M2O3 formula there are several common structures.  Al2O3, Cr2O3, Fe2O3, and V2O3 adopt the corundum structure.  Many rare earth oxides adopt the "A-type rare earth structure" which is hexagonal.  Several others plus indium oxide adopt the "C-type rare earth structure", also called "bixbyite", which is cubic and related to the fluorite structure.

List of trioxides

MO3

Carbon trioxide, CO3
Chromium trioxide, CrO3
Molybdenum trioxide, MoO3
Rhenium trioxide, ReO3
Selenium trioxide, SeO3
Sulfur trioxide, SO3
Tellurium trioxide, TeO3
Tungsten trioxide, WO3
Uranium trioxide, UO3
Xenon trioxide, XeO3

M2O3

Antimony trioxide, Sb2O3
Arsenic trioxide, As2O3
Bismuth(III) oxide, Bi2O3
Boron trioxide, B2O3
Cobalt(III) oxide, Co2O3
Dichlorine trioxide, Cl2O3
Dinitrogen trioxide, N2O3
Gadolinium oxide, Gd2O3
Gallium(III) oxide, Ga2O3
Gold trioxide, Au2O3 
Indium(III) oxide, In2O3
Iron(III) oxide, Fe2O3 
Manganese(III) oxide, Mn2O3 
Nickel(III) oxide, Ni2O3
Phosphorus trioxide, P4O6 (named before the true formula known)
Thallium(III) oxide, Tl2O3
Terbium(III) oxide, Tb2O3 
Trioxidane, H2O3
Vanadium trioxide, V2O3
Ytterbium(III) oxide, Yb2O3 
Yttrium(III) oxide, Y2O3

Other trioxides

Mineral trioxide aggregate 
Sulfur trioxide pyridine complex, SO3(py)

References